Lacina is both a given name and a surname. Notable people with that name include:

Given name
Lacina Traoré (born 1990), Ivorian footballer

Surname
 Corbin Lacina (born 1970), American football player and sports broadcaster
 Ferdinand Lacina (born 1942), Austrian politician
 Jan Lacina (born 1970), Czech politician
 Joe Lacina (born 1985), American artist, curator, and designer
 Petr Lacina (born 1973), Czech judoka
 Sarah Lacina, American police officer
 Vladek Lacina (born 1949), Czech rower

See also
 Lymire lacina, a moth of the subfamily Arctiinae

Surnames
Czech words and phrases
Masculine given names